Leucettidae is a family of sea sponges in the subclass Calcinea, first described by Max Walker de Laubenfels in 1936.

References

Calcinea